One-to-many may refer to:
 Fat link, a one-to-many link in hypertext
 Multivalued function, a one-to-many function in mathematics
 One-to-many (data model), a type of relationship and cardinality in systems analysis
 Point-to-multipoint communication, communication which has a one-to-many relationship

See also
 Cardinality (data modeling)
 Multicast
 One-to-one (disambiguation)
 Point-to-point (disambiguation)